"Knockdown" is a song by English recording artist Alesha Dixon. It was taken from her debut album Fired Up. The single was commercially released on 30 October 2006, having been made available for legal download the previous week. The song was written by Alesha and the Kent-based production team, Xenomania.

Knockdown is Dixon's lowest charting single to date, peaking at number forty-five in the UK Singles Charts, and spending just four weeks in the charts. As a result of the single's failure, Alesha was dropped from Polydor Records. However, Alesha was signed to Asylum Records, where she has achieved further success under a new label.

Music video
 
In the music video, Alesha is in a room pondering out the window and the room breaks up and you see she is around a studio. Alesha is also seen in a black and white outfit with shoulder-length black hair and a bowler hat dancing with backup dancers. She is also seen in an elegant 1950s style dress singing into an old-fashioned microphone. Toward the end of the music video, the song blends into the K-Gee remix, which featuring Alesha rapping.
There is also an alternate version of the video where there is no excerpt from the K-Gee Remix at the end of the video, but is the original ending. Directed by JT.

Track listing

CD / download

 "Knockdown" – 3:06
 "Knockdown (K-Gee Heat Remix)" (featuring Asher D) – 4:21

Charts

References

Alesha Dixon songs
2006 singles
Polydor Records singles
Song recordings produced by Xenomania
Songs written by Brian Higgins (producer)
Songs written by Alesha Dixon
Songs written by Miranda Cooper
Songs written by Shawn Lee (musician)
Songs written by Giselle Sommerville